Furu-ike Dam is an earthfill dam located in Ehime Prefecture in Japan. The dam is used for irrigation. The catchment area of the dam is 0.1 km2. The dam impounds about 1  ha of land when full and can store 25 thousand cubic meters of water. The construction of the dam was completed in 1870.

References

Dams in Ehime Prefecture
1870 establishments in Japan